The history of Methodism in the United States dates back to the mid-18th century with the ministries of early Methodist preachers such as Laurence Coughlan and Robert Strawbridge. Following the American Revolution most of the Anglican clergy who had been in America came back to England. John Wesley, the founder of Methodism, sent Thomas Coke to America where he and Francis Asbury founded the Methodist Episcopal Church, which was to later establish itself as the largest denomination in America during the 19th century.

Methodism thrived in America thanks to the First and Second Great Awakenings beginning in the 1700s. Various African-American denominations were formed during this period, including the African Methodist Episcopal Church.

In the early 20th century, many of the splintered Methodist groups joined together to form The Methodist Church (USA). Another merger in 1968 resulted in the formation of The United Methodist Church from the Evangelical United Brethren (EUB) and the Methodist Church.

Other smaller Methodist denominations in the United States, including those that split from the Methodist Episcopal Church, exist, such as the Free Methodist Church, Global Methodist Church, Evangelical Methodist Church, Congregational Methodist Church, Allegheny Wesleyan Methodist Connection and Bible Methodist Connection of Churches, among others.

Origins

In 1735, the Wesley brothers, John and Charles, went to the Georgia Colony to minister to the colonialists and teach the Gospel to the Native American tribes. John Wesley returned to England and met with a group of Moravian Church clergymen he respected. He said, "they appeared to be of one heart, as well as of one judgment, resolved to be Bible-Christians at all events; and, wherever they were, to preach with all their might plain, old, Bible Christianity". The Wesley ministers retained their membership in the Church of England. Though not always emphasized or appreciated in the Anglican churches of their day, their teaching emphasized salvation by God's grace, apprehended through faith in Christ. Three teachings they saw as the foundation of Christian faith were:

 People are all, by nature, "dead in sin," and, consequently, "children of wrath."
 They are "justified by faith alone."
 Faith produces inward and outward holiness.

Very quickly, these clergymen became popular, attracting large congregations. The nickname students had used against the Wesleys was revived; they and their followers became known as Methodists.

Early missionaries to America
In 1766, Reverend Laurence Coughlan arrived in Newfoundland and opened a school at Black Head in Conception Bay. In the late 1760s, two Methodist lay preachers emigrated to America and formed societies. Philip Embury began the work in New York at the instigation of fellow Irish Methodist Barbara Heck. Soon, Captain Webb from the British Army aided him. He formed a society in Philadelphia and traveled along the coast.

In 1770, two authorized Methodist preachers, Richard Boardman and Joseph Pilmoor, arrived from the British Connexion. They were immediately preceded by the unauthorized Robert Williams who quietly set about supporting himself by publishing American editions of Wesley's hymnbooks without obtaining permission to do so. These men were soon followed by others, including Francis Asbury. Asbury reorganized the mid-Atlantic work in accordance with the Wesleyan model. Internal conflict characterized this period. Missionaries displaced most of the local preachers and irritated many of the leading lay members. During the American Revolution, "the mid-Atlantic work" (as Wesley called it) diminished, and, by 1778, the work was reduced to one circuit. Asbury refused to leave. He remained in Delaware during this period.

Robert Strawbridge began a Methodist work in Maryland at the same time as Embury began his work in New York. They did not work together and did not know of each other's existence. Strawbridge ordained himself and organized a circuit. He trained many very influential assistants who became some of the first leaders of American Methodism. His work grew rapidly both in numbers and in geographical spread. The British missionaries discovered Strawbridge's work and annexed it into the American connection. However, the native preachers continued to work side by side with the missionaries, and they continued to recruit and dispatch more native preachers. Southern Methodism was not dependent on missionaries in the same way as mid-Atlantic Methodism.

Up until this time, with the exception of Strawbridge, none of the missionaries or American preachers was ordained. Consequently, the Methodist people received the sacraments at the hands of ministers from established Anglican churches. Most of the Anglican priests were Loyalists who fled to England, New York or Canada during the war. In the absence of Anglican ordination, a group of native preachers ordained themselves. This caused a split between the Asbury faction and the southern preachers. Asbury mediated the crisis by convincing the southern preachers to wait for Wesley's response to the sacramental crisis. That response came in 1784.

John Wesley, the founder of Methodism, came to believe that the New Testament evidence did not leave the power of ordination to the priesthood in the hands of bishops but that other priests could do ordination. In 1784, he ordained preachers for Scotland and England and America, with power to administer the sacraments (this was a major reason for Methodism's final split from the Church of England after Wesley's death). At that time, Wesley sent the Rev. Dr. Thomas Coke to America to form an independent American Methodist church. The native circuit riders met in late December. Coke had orders to ordain Asbury as a joint superintendent of the new church. However, Asbury turned to the assembled conference and said he would not accept it unless the preachers voted him into that office. This was done, and from that moment forward, the general superintendents received their authority from the conference. Later, Coke convinced the general conference that he and Asbury were bishops and added the title to the discipline. It caused a great deal of controversy. Wesley did not approve of 'bishops' who had not been ordained by bishops. The first annual conference of the newly organized Methodist Episcopal Church was held at Green Hill House near Louisburg, Franklin County, North Carolina, April 19, 1785.  Four annual conferences of the Methodist Episcopal Church were held at the house of Green Hill and Hill was their host.

By the 1792 general conference of the Methodist Episcopal Church, the controversy relating to episcopal power boiled over. Ultimately, the delegates sided with Bishop Asbury. However, the Republican Methodists split off from the Methodist Episcopal Church (MEC) in 1792. Also, William Hammet (a missionary ordained by Wesley who traveled to America from Antigua with Bishop Coke), led a successful revolt against the MEC in 1791. He opposed Bishop Asbury and the episcopacy. He formed his people into the American Primitive Methodist Church (not directly connected with the British Primitive Methodist Church). Both American churches operated in the Southeast and presaged the episcopal debates of later reformers. Regardless, Asbury remained the leading bishop of early American Methodism and did not share his "appointing" authority until Bishop McKendree was elected in 1808. Coke had problems with the American preachers. His authoritarian style alienated many. Soon, he became a missionary bishop of sorts and never had much influence in America.

First and Second Awakenings

The First Great Awakening was a religious movement among colonials in the 1730s and 1740s. The English Calvinist Methodist preacher George Whitefield played a major role, traveling up and down the colonies and preaching in a dramatic and emotional style, accepting everyone as his audience.

The new style of sermons and the way people practiced their faith breathed new life into religion in America. People became passionately and emotionally involved in their religion, rather than passively listening to intellectual discourse in a detached manner. People began to study the Bible at home, which effectively decentralized the means of informing the public on religious matters and was akin to the individualistic trends present in Europe during the Protestant Reformation.

The first American Methodist bishops were Thomas Coke and Francis Asbury, whose boyhood home, Bishop Asbury Cottage, in West Bromwich, England, is now a museum. Upon the formation of the Methodist Episcopal Church in America at the Baltimore Christmas Conference in 1784, Coke (already ordained in the Church of England) ordained Asbury a deacon, elder, and bishop each on three successive days. Circuit riders, many of whom were laymen, traveled by horseback to preach the gospel and establish churches until there was scarcely any crossroad community in America without a Methodist expression of Christianity. One of the most famous circuit riders was Robert Strawbridge who lived in the vicinity of Carroll County, Maryland soon after arriving in the Colonies around 1760.

The Second Great Awakening was a nationwide wave of revivals, from 1790 to 1840. In New England, the renewed interest in religion inspired a wave of social activism among Yankees; Methodism grew rapidly and established several colleges, notably Boston University. Reverend David Munsey performed many revivals across the country making his home in Augusta County, Virginia from 1800 to 1856.  His brother Reverend Zachariah Munsey also coordinated his efforts for the revival from his home in Montgomery County, Virginia.  In the "burned over district" of western New York, the spirit of revival burned brightly. Methodism saw the emergence of a Holiness movement. In the west, especially at Cane Ridge, Kentucky and in Tennessee, the revival strengthened the Methodists and the Baptists. The Methodists appealed especially to the urban middle class. Methodism continued to expand into the Midwest - the Garrett–Evangelical Theological Seminary was founded in 1855 near Chicago by Eliza Clark Garrett in order to educate clergy for the region.

Civil War and Reconstruction
Disputes over slavery placed the church in difficulty in the first half of the 19th century, with the northern church leaders fearful of a split with the South, and reluctant to take a stand. The Wesleyan Methodist Connexion (later became The Wesleyan Church) and the Free Methodist Churches were formed by staunch abolitionists, and the Free Methodists were especially active in the Underground Railroad, which helped to free the slaves. Finally, in a much larger split, in 1845 at Louisville, the churches of the slaveholding states left the Methodist Episcopal Church and formed The Methodist Episcopal Church, South. The northern and southern branches were reunited in 1939, when slavery was no longer an issue. In this merger also joined the Methodist Protestant Church. Some southerners, conservative in theology, and strongly segregationist, opposed the merger, and formed the Southern Methodist Church in 1940.

Many Northerners had only recently become religious and religion was a powerful force in their lives. No denomination was more active in supporting the Union than the Methodist Episcopal Church. Carwardine argues that for many Methodists, the victory of Lincoln in 1860 heralded the arrival of the kingdom of God in America. They were moved into action by a vision of freedom for slaves, freedom from the terror unleashed on godly abolitionists, release from the Slave Power's evil grip on the state, and a new direction for the Union. Methodists formed a major element of the popular support for the Radical Republicans with their hard line toward the white South. Dissident Methodists left the church.   
  
The Methodist family magazine Ladies' Repository promoted Christian family activism. Its articles provided moral uplift to women and children. It portrayed the War as a great moral crusade against a decadent Southern civilization corrupted by slavery. It recommended activities that family members could perform in order to aid the Union cause.

During Reconstruction the Methodists took the lead in helping form Methodist churches for Freedmen, and moving into Southern cities even to the point of taking control, with Army help, of buildings that had belonged to the southern branch of the church. To help the Freedmen the church set up the Freedmen's Aid Society focused on creating an educational system for former slaves. This organization, along with the church's Department of Education for Negroes of the Board of Education, helped provide education to former slaves and their children. Within three months of its organization, the Freedmen's Aid Society had begun work in the South. By the end of the first year, the society had more than fifty teachers.

The Third Great Awakening from 1858 to 1908 saw enormous growth in Methodist membership, and a proliferation of institutions such as colleges (e.g., Morningside College). Methodists were often involved in the Missionary Awakening and the Social Gospel Movement. The awakening in so many cities in 1858 started the movement, but in the North it was interrupted by the Civil War. In the South, on the other hand, the Civil War stimulated revivals, especially in Lee's army.

Modern history

In 1914–1917 many Methodist ministers made strong pleas for world peace. To meet their demands, President Woodrow Wilson (a Presbyterian), promised "a war to end all wars." In the 1930s many Methodists favored isolationist policies. Thus in 1936, Methodist Bishop James Baker, of the San Francisco Conference, released a poll of ministers showing 56% opposed warfare. However, the Methodist Federation did call for a boycott of Japan, which had invaded China and was disrupting missionary activity there. In Chicago, sixty-two local African Methodist Episcopal churches voted their support for the Roosevelt administration's policy, while opposing any plan to send American troops overseas to fight. When war came in 1941, the vast majority of Methodists strongly supported the national war effort, but there were also a few (673) conscientious objectors.

The United Methodist Church was formed in 1968 as a result of a merger between the Evangelical United Brethren (EUB) and The Methodist Church (USA). The former church had resulted from mergers of several groups of German Methodist heritage. There was no longer any need or desire to worship in the German language. The merged church had approximately 9 million members as of the late 1990s. While United Methodist Church in America membership has been declining, associated groups in developing countries are growing rapidly.

American Methodist churches are generally organized on a connectional model, related but not identical to that used in Britain. Pastors are assigned to congregations by bishops, distinguishing it from presbyterian government. Methodist denominations typically give lay members representation at regional and national meetings (conferences) at which the business of the church is conducted, making it different from most episcopal government (The Episcopal Church USA, however, has a representational polity giving lay members, priests, and bishops voting privileges). This connectional organizational model differs further from the congregational model, for example of Baptist, and Congregationalist Churches, among others.

In addition to the United Methodist Church, there are over 40 other denominations that descend from John Wesley's Methodist movement. Some, such as the African Methodist Episcopal Church, the AME Zion Church, the Free Methodist Church, the Wesleyan Church (formerly Wesleyan Methodist Connection), the Congregational Methodist Church and First Congregational Methodist Church are explicitly Methodist. The Primitive Methodist Church is a continuing branch of the former British Primitive Methodist Church. Others do not call themselves Methodist, but are related to varying degrees. The Evangelical Church was formed by a group of EUB congregations who dissented from the merger which formed the United Methodist Church. The United Methodist Church has also taken steps to strengthen ties with its fellow Methodist churches, as well as other Protestant denominations in the United States. Since 1985, the UMC has been exploring a possible merger with three historically African-American Methodist denominations: the African Methodist Episcopal Church, the African Methodist Episcopal Zion Church, and the Christian Methodist Episcopal Church. A Commission on Pan Methodist Cooperation and Union formed in 2000 to carry out work on such a merger.

The holiness revival was primarily among people of Methodist persuasion, who felt that the church had once again become apathetic, losing the Wesleyan zeal. Some important events of this revival were the writings of Phoebe Palmer during the mid-19th century, the establishment of the first of many holiness camp meetings at Vineland, New Jersey in 1867, and the founding of Asbury College (1890), and other similar institutions in the US around the turn of the 20th century. The Allegheny Conference of the Wesleyan Methodist Church entered into a schism with the rest of the Wesleyan Methodist Church, a Methodist denomination in the holiness movement, because it favored a connexional polity and opposed the merger of the Wesleyan Methodist Church with the Pilgrim Holiness Church; while the rest of the Wesleyan Methodist Church became the Wesleyan Church, the Allegheny Conference of the Wesleyan Methodist Church became the Allegheny Wesleyan Methodist Connection, which today, is one of the largest denominations in the conservative holiness movement.

In 2022, a schism within the United Methodist Church led to many traditionalist United Methodist theologians, clergy and laity forming the Global Methodist Church after several modernist United Methodist clergy announced that they would not abide by the denomination's Book of Discipline concerning issues on human sexuality.

From its beginning in England, Methodism laid emphasis on social service and education. Numerous originally Methodist institutions of higher education were founded in the United States in the early half of the 19th century, and today altogether there are about twenty universities and colleges named as "Methodist" or "Wesleyan" still in existence.

Additionally, the Methodist Church has created a number of Wesley Foundation establishments on college campuses. These ministries are created to reach out to students, and often provide student housing to a few students in exchange for service to the ministry.

United Methodist elders and pastors may marry and have families. They are placed in congregations by their bishop. Elders and pastors can either ask for a new appointment or their church can request that they be re-appointed elsewhere. If the elder is a full-time pastor, the church is required to provide either a house or a housing allowance for the pastor.

Whereas most American Methodist worship is modeled after the Anglican Communion's Book of Common Prayer, a unique feature was the once practiced observance of the season of Kingdomtide, which encompasses the last thirteen weeks before Advent, thus dividing the long season after Pentecost into two discrete segments. During Kingdomtide, Methodist liturgy emphasizes charitable work and alleviating the suffering of the poor. This practice was last seen in The Book of Worship for Church and Home by The United Methodist Church, 1965, and The Book of Hymns, 1966. While some congregations and their pastors might still follow this old calendar, the Revised Common Lectionary, with its naming and numbering of Days in the Calendar of the Church Year, is used widely. However, congregations who strongly identify with their African American roots and tradition would not usually follow the Revised Common Lectionary.

Adding more complexity to the mix, there are United Methodist congregations who orient their worship to the "free" church tradition, so particular liturgies are not observed. The United Methodist Book of Worship and The Hymns of the United Methodist Church are voluntarily followed in varying degrees. Such churches employ the liturgy and rituals therein as optional resources, but their use is not mandatory.

Social principles and participation in movements
From the movement's beginnings, with its roots in Wesleyan theology, Methodism has distinguished itself as a religious movement strongly tied to social issues. As father of the movement, John Wesley injected much of his own social philosophy into the movement as a whole. Wesley's personal social philosophy was characterized by "an instructive reluctance to criticize existing institutions [which] was overborne by indignation at certain abuses which cried out for rectification." The Methodist Church's responses to injustices in society are embodiments of the Wesleyan traditions of mercy and justice.

At the end of the 19th- and beginning of the 20th-centuries, the Methodist Church responded strongly to what it regarded as social ills (e.g., gambling, use of intoxicating beverages, etc.) with attention to the Methodist doctrines of sanctification and perfection through Christ. In the United States, today's United Methodist Church continues to embody Methodist traditions in their response to social needs through the General Board of Church and Society and the General Board of Global Ministries.

In the United States, the United Methodist Church is the second-largest sponsor of Boy Scout units, with 11,078 chartered units, representing over 370,000 youth members; by way of contrast, the LDS Church, which sponsors a total of 37,882 units - over three times as many - can boast a total youth membership of slightly over 420,000, only a 13.5% increase over the UMC's total.

Attitudes toward slavery
Like most other national organizations, the Methodist Church experienced tensions and rifts over the slavery dispute. Both sides of the argument used the doctrines of the movement and scriptural evidence to support their case.

The initial statement of the Methodist position on slavery was delivered in the Conference minutes from the annual conference in 1780. After a comprehensive statement of the varied reasons slavery goes against "the laws of God, man, and nature", the Conference answered in the affirmative to the question, "do we pass our disapprobation on all our friends who keep slaves and advise their freedom?" This position was put into action in 1783. Preachers from the Baltimore Conference were required, under threat of suspension, to free their slaves. By 1784, similar requirements were made of Methodists as a whole, laity and clergy alike. The negative reaction to this requirement was so strong that it had to be abandoned, but the rule was kept in the Book of Discipline.

As slavery disputes intensified in the 19th century, there emerged two doctrines within the Methodist Church. Churches in the South were primarily proslavery, while northern churches started antislavery movements. The apologia of the Southern churches was largely based in Old Testament scriptures, which often represent slavery as a part of the natural order of things. New Testament writings were sometimes used to support the case for slavery as well. Some of the writings of Paul, especially in Ephesians, instruct slaves to remain obedient to their masters. Southern ideology also argued that slavery was beneficial for slaves, as well as their owners, saying that they were offered protections from many ills because of their slavery. The antislavery movement in northern churches strengthened and solidified in response to the pro-slavery apologia of Southern churches.

Education of young people

The Methodist church has always been strongly oriented towards the religious lives of the young. In 1848, the General Conference stated, "when the Church has collected...a great population born within [her] bosom, she cannot fulfill her high mission unless she takes measure to prevent this population from being withdrawn from under her care in the period of its youth." The first two American bishops of the Methodist Church, Thomas Coke and Francis Asbury, opened a preparatory school in Abingdon, Maryland in 1787. The school was a strict environment, with seven hours a day devoted to study. The venture ended when a fire destroyed the building in which the school was housed.

In the 1870s, there was a broad movement toward incorporating Sunday schools into the doctrines of churches as a way to take ownership of the Christian education of children. This was the first great interdenominational movement the United States had ever seen. Methodists invested heavily in the cause of Christian education because of their emphasis on the child's right to and ability to "respond to divine influences from the beginning."

Beginning after World War II, the Methodist churches in the United States continued developing, at a much greater pace, ministries on Universities, Colleges, Junior Colleges and other higher education institutions, on campuses of both church-owned and state schools throughout the United States and Canada, and to a lesser degree in Australia, New Zealand and the United Kingdom. Methodism boasts the largest number of higher education ministries, including teaching positions, of any Protestant denomination in the world in close competition with the Southern Baptist Convention. This emphasis is, in part, a reflection of the Methodist movement's earliest roots in The Oxford Holy Club, founded by John Wesley, his brother Charles, George Whitefield and others as a response to what they saw as the pervasive permissiveness and debauchery of Oxford University, and specifically Lincoln College when they attended. It is from the Holy Club that the earliest Methodist societies were formed and spread.

Temperance movement
The temperance movement was the social concern which most broadly captured the interest and enthusiasm of the Methodist Church. The movement was strongly tied to John Wesley's theology and social principles. Wesley's abhorrence of alcohol use was taken up by American Methodists, many of whom were active and prominent leaders within the movement.

The temperance movement appealed strongly to the Methodist doctrines of sanctification and Christian perfection. The Methodist presentation of sanctification includes the understanding that justification before God comes through faith. Therefore, those who believe are made new in Christ. The believer's response to this sanctification then is to uphold God's word in the world. A large part of this, especially in the late-19th century, was "to be their brother's keepers, or [...] their brother's brothers." Because of this sense of duty toward the other members of the church, many Methodists were personally temperate out of a hope that their restraint would give strength to their brothers. The Methodist stance against drinking was strongly stated in the Book of Discipline. Initially, the issue taken was limited to distilled liquors, but quickly evolved into teetotalism and Methodists were commonly known to abstain from all alcoholic beverages.

In 1880, the general conference included in the Discipline a broad statement which included, "Temperance is a Christian virtue, Scripturally enjoined." Due to the temperate stance of the church, the practice of Eucharist was altered — to this day, Methodist churches most commonly use grape juice symbolically during Communion rather than wine. The Methodist church distinguished itself from many other denominations in their beliefs about state control of alcohol. Where many other denominations, including Roman Catholics, Protestant Episcopalians, Lutherans, and Unitarians, believed that the ill-effects of liquor should be controlled by self-discipline and individual restraint, Methodists believed that it was the duty of the government to enforce restrictions on the use of alcohol. In 1904, the Board of Temperance was created by the General Conference to help push the Temperance agenda.

The women of the Methodist Church were strongly mobilized by the temperance movement. In 1879, a Methodist woman, Frances E. Willard, was voted to the presidency of the Women's Christian Temperance Union, an organization that was founded in December 1873, and was characterized by heavy Methodist participation. To this day, the Women's Division of the General Board of Global Missions holds property on Capitol Hill in Washington, DC, which was built using funds provided by laypeople. Women of the church were responsible for 70% of the $650,000 it cost to construct the building in 1922. The building was intended to serve as the Methodist Church's social reform presence of the Hill. The Board of Temperance, Prohibition and Public Morals was especially prominent within the building.

Rejection of same-sex marriages and LGBT clergy
"Methodists stand almost alone among mainline denominations in not performing same-sex marriages, in contrast to the Episcopal Church, the Presbyterian Church (USA), the Evangelical Lutheran Church in America, and the United Church of Christ."

The United Methodist Church delegates met in St. Louis on February 26, 2019, and voted 438 to 384 to maintain its policies defining marriage as a covenant between one man and one woman and barring "self-avowed practicing homosexuals" from serving as clergy.  The plan made it easier to enforce penalties for violating the teaching, which is part of the church's Book of Discipline.

See also

 Methodist Episcopal Church, South
 Christian Methodist Episcopal Church
 Methodist Episcopal Church
 African Methodist Episcopal Church
 African Methodist Episcopal Zion Church
Wesleyanism
United Methodist Church
Articles of Religion (Methodist)
Works of Piety
Works of Mercy
List of Methodist churches in the United States

References

Further reading
 Alexander; Gross. A History of the Methodist Church, South in the United States (1907) online
 Bailey Kenneth K. "The Post Civil War Racial Separations in Southern Protestantism: Another Look." Church History 46 ( December 1977): 453–73.
 Bailey, Julius H. Race Patriotism Protest and Print Culture in the AME Church. Knoxville, TN: University of Tennessee Press, 2012.
 Bailey, Kenneth K., Southern White Protestantism in the Twentieth Century 1964.
 Bode, Frederick A., Protestantism and the New South: North Carolina Baptists and Methodists in Political Crisis. University Press of Virginia, 1975.
 Boles, John B., The Great Revival, 1787-1805: The Origins of the Southern Evangelical Mind University of Kentucky Press, 1972.
 Brown, Jr., Canter and Larry Eugene Rivers. For a Great and Grand Purpose: The Beginnings of the AMEZ Church in Florida, 1864–1905 (2004)
 Cameron, Richard M. (ed.) (1961) Methodism and Society in Historical Perspective, 4 vol., New York: Abingdon Press
 Campbell, James T. Songs of Zion: The African Methodist Episcopal Church in the United States and South Africa. New York: Oxford University Press, 1995.
 Carney, Charity R. Ministers and Masters: Methodism, Manhood, and Honor in the Old South. Baton Rouge, LA: Louisiana State University Press, 2011.
 Cone, James. "God Our Father, Christ Our Redeemer, Man Our Brother: A Theological Interpretation of the AME Church," A.M.E. Church Review, vol. 106, no. 341 (1991).
 Dickerson, Dennis C., Religion, Race, and Region: Research Notes on A.M.E. Church History Nashville, A.M.E. Sunday School Union, 1995.
 Farish, Hunter D., The Circuit Rider Dismounts: A Social History of Southern Methodism, 1865-1900 1938
 Gregg, Howard D. History of the African Methodist Episcopal Church: The Black Church in Action. Nashville, TN: Henry A. Belin, Jr., 1980.
 Hatch, Nathan O. The Democratization of American Christianity (1989) credits the Methodists and Baptists for making Americans more equalitarian
 Heatwole, Charles. "A geography of the African Methodist Episcopal Zion Church." Southeastern Geographer (1986) 26#1 pp: 1-11.
 Heyrman, Christine Leigh. Southern Cross: The Beginnings of the Bible Belt Alfred A. Knopf, 1997.
 Hildebrand; Reginald F. The Times Were Strange and Stirring: Methodist Preachers and the Crisis of Emancipation Duke University Press, 1995
 Hoggard, James Clinton. African Methodist Episcopal Zion Church, 1972-1996: A Bicentennial Commemorative History (AME Zion Publishing House, 1998)
 Loveland, Anne C., Southern Evangelicals and the Social Order, 1800-1860 Louisiana State University Press, 1980
 Lyerly,  Cynthia Lynn. Methodism and the Southern Mind, 1770-1810 (1998)
 Martin, Sandy Dwayne.  "For God and Race: The Religious and Political Leadership of AMEZ Bishop James Walker Hood (University of South Carolina Press, 1999)
 Mathews, Donald G. Slavery and Methodism: A Chapter in American Morality, 1780-1845 (1965)
 Mathews, Donald G. Religion in the Old South University of Chicago Press, 1977.
 Mathews-Gardner, A. Lanethea. "From Ladies Aid to NGO: Transformations in Methodist Women's Organizing in Postwar America," in Laughlin, Kathleen A., and Jacqueline L. Castledine, eds., Breaking the Wave: Women, Their Organizations, and Feminism, 1945-1985 (2011) pp. 99–112
 McDowell, John Patrick. The Social Gospel in the South: The Woman's Home Mission Movement in the Methodist Episcopal Church, South, 1886-1939 (1982)
 McDowell, Patrick, The Social Gospel in the South: The Woman's Home Mission Movement in the Methodist Episcopal Church, South, 1886–1939. Louisiana State University Press, 1982
 Meyer, Donald The Protestant Search for Political Realism, 1919-1941, (1988) 
 Morrow; Ralph E. Northern Methodism and Reconstruction (1956) online
 Norwood, John Nelson. The Schism in the Methodist Episcopal Church 1844: A Study of Slavery and Ecclesiastical Politics (Porcupine Press, 1976)
 Orchard, Vance, et al. Early History of the Milton-Freewater Area Valley Herald of Milton-Freewater, 1962
 Owen, Christopher H. The Sacred Flame of Love: Methodism and Society in Nineteenth-Century Georgia University of Georgia Press, 1998.
 , reprinted Arno 1972; an official history
 Richey, Russell E. and Kenneth E. Rowe, eds. Rethinking Methodist History: A Bicentennial Historical Consultation (1985), historiographical essays by scholars
 Richey, Russell. Early American Methodism Indiana University Press, 1991.
 Robert, Dana L., and David W. Scott. "World Growth of the United Methodist Church in Comparative Perspective: A Brief Statistical Analysis." Methodist Review 3 (2011): 37-54.
 Raboteau, Albert J. Slave Religion: The "Invisible Institution" in the Antebellum South Oxford University Press, 1978.
 Schmidt, Jean Miller Grace Sufficient: A History of Women in American Methodism, 1760-1939, (1999)
 Schneider, A. Gregory. The Way of the Cross Leads Home: The Domestication of American Methodism (1993)
 Schweiger; Beth Barton. The Gospel Working up: Progress and the Pulpit in Nineteenth Century Virginia Oxford UP, 2000
 Snay, Mitchell. Gospel of Disunion: Religion and Separatism in the Antebellum South Cambridge University Press, 1993.
 Sommerville, Raymond R. An Ex-colored Church: Social Activism in the CME Church, 1870-1970 (Mercer University Press, 2004)
 Sparks, Randy J. On Jordan's Stormy Banks: Evangelicalism in Mississippi, 1773-1876 University of Georgia Press, 1994.
 Spragin, Rev. Dr. Ore. The History of the Christian Methodist Episcopal Church 1870-2009 (Wyndham Hall Press, 2011) 304pp
 Stevens, Abel. History of the Methodist Episcopal Church in the United States of America (1884)  online
 Stowell, Daniel W. Rebuilding Zion: The Religious Reconstruction of the South, 1863-1877  Oxford University Press, 1998.
 Stroupe, Henry Smith. The Religious Press in the South Atlantic States, 1802-1865 Duke University Press, 1956.
 Sweet, William Warren Methodism in American History, (1954) 472pp.
 Sweet, William Warren. Virginia Methodism: A History (1955)
 Teasdale, Mark R. Methodist Evangelism, American Salvation: The Home Missions of the Methodist Episcopal Church, 1860-1920 (Wipf and Stock Publishers, 2014)
 Tucker, Karen B. Westerfield. American Methodist Worship (2001)
 Watkins, William Turner. Out of Aldersgate Nashville: Publishing House of the Methodist Episcopal Church, South, 1937.
 Westerfield Tucker; Karen B. American Methodist Worship Oxford University Press. 2000.
 Wigger, John H. Taking Heaven by Storm: Methodism and the Rise of Popular Christianity in America, (1998) 269pp;  focus on 1770-1910
 Wigger, John H. and Nathan O. Hatch, eds. Methodism and the Shaping of American Culture (2001)

Primary sources 
 
 Norwood, Fredrick A., ed. Sourcebook of American Methodism (1982) 
 Richey, Russell E., Rowe, Kenneth E. and Schmidt, Jean Miller (eds.) The Methodist Experience in America: a sourcebook, (2000) . – 756 p. of original documents
 Sweet, William Warren (ed.) Religion on the American Frontier: Vol. 4, The Methodists,1783-1840: A Collection of Source Materials, (1946)  800 p. of documents regarding the American frontier
 ; pp 25–34 for Methodist data

External links
 Methodist History Journal
 The Asbury Triptych Series: book series on Francis Asbury and the Methodist movement in England and in America.